The Siege of Belgrade is a comic opera in three acts, principally composed by Stephen Storace to an English libretto by James Cobb. It incorporated music by Mozart, Salieri, Paisiello and Martini, and is therefore considered a pasticcio opera, as well as a Singspiel in English language, as it contained a spoken dialogue. It premiered on 1 January 1791 at the Theatre Royal, Drury Lane, in London with a great success, featuring many famous singers and actors of the time, such as sopranos Nancy Storace and Anna Maria Crouch, tenor Michael Kelly as well as Shakespearean actors (in spoken roles) such as John Bannister and Richard "Dicky" Suett.

Roles
Roles and performers at the premiere in London on 1 January 1791:
Men
Saraskier, the leader of Turkish forces (tenor) – Mr. Kelly
Colonel Cohenberg, Austrian Commander (spoken role) – Mr. Palmer
Krohnfeldt (spoken role?) – Mr. R. Palmer
Ismael, Commissioner of Saraskier and Yuseph (baritone) – Mr. Fox
Yuseph, Turkish kadi (tenor) – Mr. Suett
Leopold, Serbian peasant, in love with Lilla (tenor) – Mr. Bannister Jr.
Peter, Serbian peasant, Lilla's brother and in love with Ghita (tenor) – Mr. Dignum
Anselm, Serbian peasant (baritone) – Mr. Cook (later Mr. Sedgewick)
Michael (spoken role) – Mr. Hollingsworth
Soldier (spoken role) – Mr. Dubois
Women
Lilla, Serbian peasant girl, Peter's sister (soprano) – Signora Storace
Catherine, wife of colonel Cohenberg (soprano) – Mrs. Crouch
Ghita, Serbian peasant girl (soprano) – Mrs. Bland
Fatima (spoken role) – Miss Hagley
Soldiers, Guards, Peasants, etc.

Notable musical numbers
"When justice claims the victim due" (Act 1, Trio for the Seraskier, Lilla and Ghita), originally sung by Michael Kelly, Nancy Storace and Mrs. Bland
"Domestic peace, my soul's desire" (Act 3, Lilla's aria), originally sung by Nancy Storace

See also
Siege of Belgrade (1789)

References
Notes

Cited sources

1791 operas
Operas
Operas by Stephen Storace
English-language operas